Clint Essers (born 21 January 1997) is a Dutch professional footballer who plays as a right-back for Eerste Divisie club MVV.

Club career

Fortuna Sittard
Essers played youth football for RKHSV and RKSV Heer before joining the Fortuna Sittard youth academy in 2007. He made his Eerste Divisie debut for Fortuna on 7 April 2017 in a 4–1 home win over Helmond Sport, replacing Jorrit Smeets in the 83rd minute.

In the 2017–18 season, Essers became a starter for Fortuna who finished second in the league table and reached promotion to the Eredivisie.

MVV
On 31 August 2021, he moved to Eerste Divisie club MVV on a one-year contract with an option for the second year. He made his debut for the club on 5 September 2021, replacing Rico Zeegers in the 80th minute of a 3–0 league win over Telstar. On 14 January 2022, Essers scored his first professional goal in the 91st minute of a 2–1 away loss to Telstar in the Eerste Divisie. The following week, he tore the anterior cruciate ligament of his knee, sidelining him for an extended period of time.

Career statistics

References

External links
 

1997 births
Footballers from Maastricht
Living people
Dutch footballers
Association football defenders
Fortuna Sittard players
MVV Maastricht players
Eredivisie players
Eerste Divisie players